is a Japanese professional footballer who plays as a midfielder.

Career
Born in Osaka, Nagaoka has played for Hokuyo Senior High School, Londrina, Avaí, Carpenedolo, Maisons Alfort, North York Astros, Przebój Wolbrom, SK Blāzma, Tarxien Rainbows, AFA Olaine, Mosta, Qormi, Pembroke Athleta and Naxxar Lions.

References

1984 births
Living people
Japanese footballers
Association football midfielders
Londrina Esporte Clube players
Avaí FC players
A.C. Carpenedolo players
North York Astros players
Przebój Wolbrom players
SK Blāzma players
Tarxien Rainbows F.C. players
AFA Olaine players
Mosta F.C. players
Qormi F.C. players
Pembroke Athleta F.C. players
Naxxar Lions F.C. players
Canadian Soccer League (1998–present) players
Latvian Higher League players
Maltese Premier League players
Japanese expatriate footballers
Japanese expatriate sportspeople in Brazil
Expatriate footballers in Brazil
Japanese expatriate sportspeople in Italy
Expatriate footballers in Italy
Japanese expatriate sportspeople in France
Expatriate footballers in France
Japanese expatriate sportspeople in Canada
Expatriate soccer players in Canada
Japanese expatriate sportspeople in Poland
Expatriate footballers in Poland
Japanese expatriate sportspeople in Latvia
Expatriate footballers in Latvia
Japanese expatriate sportspeople in Malta
Expatriate footballers in Malta